The northern pied babbler (Turdoides hypoleuca) is a species of bird in the family Leiothrichidae.
It is found in Kenya and Tanzania.
Its natural habitats are subtropical or tropical moist lowland forest and subtropical or tropical dry shrubland.

References

Collar, N. J. & Robson, C. 2007. Family Timaliidae (Babblers)  pp. 70–291 in; del Hoyo, J., Elliott, A. & Christie, D.A. eds. Handbook of the Birds of the World, Vol. 12. Picathartes to Tits and Chickadees. Lynx Edicions, Barcelona.

northern pied babbler
Birds of East Africa
northern pied babbler
Taxonomy articles created by Polbot